is the 26th single by the Japanese J-pop group Every Little Thing, released on November 12, 2003. It was used as the theme song for the drama Pure Love III.

Track listing
  (Words - Kaori Mochida / music - Hideyuki Obata)
  (Words - Kaori Mochida / music - HIKARI)
  (Words - Kaori Mochida / music - Kazuhito Kikuchi)
  (instrumental)
  (instrumental)
  (instrumental)

Chart positions

External links
  information at Avex Network.
  information at Oricon.

2003 singles
Every Little Thing (band) songs
Songs written by Kaori Mochida